The 2002 Cork Senior Football Championship was the 114th staging of the Cork Senior Football Championship since its establishment by the Cork County Board in 1887. The draw for the opening fixtures took place on 9 December 2001. The championship began on 7 April 2002 and ended on 6 October 2002.

Nemo Rangers entered the championship as the defending champions.

On 6 October 2002, Nemo Rangers won the championship following a 0-15 to 1-07 defeat of Bishopstown in the final. This was their 13th championship title overall and their second title in succession.

Colin Corkery from the Nemo Rangers club was the championship's top scorer with 2-33.

Results

Preliminary round

First round

Second round

Ballincollig received a bye in this round.

Third round

Fourth round

Quarter-finals

Semi-finals

Final

Championship statistics

Top scorers

Overall

In a single game

Miscellaneous
 Nemo Rangers are the first club to win three titles in a row since Clonakilty between 1942-44.
 Bishopstown qualify for the final for the first time.

References

Cork Senior Football Championship
Cork Senior Football Championship